Avenda Systems is a Silicon Valley start-up, that develops network access security products with operations in Santa Clara, California, USA and Bangalore, India.

About the Company

The company was founded in 2006 by Krishna Prabhakar, and Santhosh Cheeniyil and a strong engineering team with an excellent track record in network and security management. Before founding Avenda, both Krishna and Santhosh managed a variety of projects at Cisco Systems for 7 years in the Security Technology Group.

Avenda Systems is also funded by OVP Venture Partners, private investors, United States Department of Defense (DoD), including U.S. Air Force and Missile Defense Agency, and the Department of Homeland Security.

News and Events
November 17, 2011 - Aruba Networks enters agreement to acquire Avenda Systems 

August 16, 2011 - New eTIPS 4.0 release sets the bar for large-scale enterprise deployments. The 5040b appliance is rated at 20,000 simultaneous sessions, according to technical contacts at Avenda. 20k simultaneous sessions in one chassis is largest capacity per box in the industry according to research conducted by integrator Asiemo Consulting.

May 3, 2011 - Avenda joins HP AllianceOne Program, delivers 802.1X enterprise class NAC for HP Networks

March 28, 2011 - Avenda expands with sales offices in Paris, Frankfurt and England

References

External links
 Avenda at Interops Lab
 Microsoft on Avenda
 Cisco and Avenda Sign Technology Licensing Agreement
 DBusiness News
 Reuters

2005 establishments in California
2011 disestablishments in California
American companies established in 2005
American companies disestablished in 2011
Companies based in Santa Clara, California
Computer companies established in 2005
Computer companies disestablished in 2011
Defunct computer companies of the United States
Defunct computer hardware companies
Defunct networking companies
Networking companies of the United States
Networking hardware companies